Dr Wendy K. Jarvie is a public policy academic and retired senior Australian public servant.

Education and career
Attending Flinders University, Jarvie was awarded her PhD in Geography in 1984. After completing her PhD, Jarvie joined the Australian Public Service in the Bureau of Labour Market Research.

Between 2001 and 2007, Wendy Jarvie was a Deputy Secretary at the Department of Education, Science and Training, staying in the role when the department transitioned to become the Department of Education, Employment and Workplace Relations. During her time at DEST, Jarvie was involved with, among other things, policy behind Australia's Vocational and Technical Education System. Jarvie left the Australian Public Service in 2008.

In addition she worked for three years in the World Bank in Washington (1998-2001), initially in the Operations Evaluation Department where she was a manager of corporate evaluations and evaluation methods, and later in Operations and Country Strategies where she worked on small states issues, and managed a taskforce on Bank strategies for middle income countries.

In 2010, while a visiting professor at the University of New South Wales, Jarvie spoke on implementing and sustaining reforms in Australian Aboriginal and Torres Strait Islander communities.

In 2012, Jarvie was appointed to be a member of the AusAID Independent Evaluation Committee.

References

Living people
Year of birth missing (living people)
Secretaries of the Australian Government Education Department